Keskusurheilukenttä is a multi-use stadium in Kouvola, Finland. It is used mostly for football matches and is the home stadium of the bandy club Kouvolan Sudet (Wolves). The stadium has an capacity of 12,000 spectators.

External links
Venue information

Football venues in Finland
Bandy venues in Finland
Kouvola
Buildings and structures in Kymenlaakso